is the fourth book in Japanese artist Toriyama Sekien's famous Gazu Hyakki Yagyō tetralogy. A version of the tetralogy translated and annotated in English was published in 2016. The title is a pun; "hyakki", normally written with the characters "hundred" and "oni", is instead written with "hundred" and "vessels". This hints that the majority of the yōkai portrayed in its pages are of the variety known as tsukumogami, man-made objects taken sentient form. Hyakki Tsurezure Bukuro is preceded in the series by Gazu Hyakki Yagyō, Konjaku Gazu Zoku Hyakki, and Konjaku Hyakki Shūi.

Published in 1781, it was inspired in part by Tsurezuregusa (Tales in Idleness), a 14th-century essay collection by the monk Yoshida Kenkō. The book takes the form of a supernatural bestiary of yōkai. Unlike previous books in the series, the majority of Hyakki Tsurezure Bukuros yōkai appear to be of Sekien's own creation, based on turns of phrase or stories from Tsurezuregusa and other works of literature. Also unlike the other books in the series, Hyakki Tsurezure Bukuro has a rudimentary narrative framework, described as the record of a strange dream in early printings (the third printing omits this introduction).

The book is compiled in three sub-volumes: Jō, Chū, and Ge (literally "top", "middle", and "bottom", but generally translated as first, second, and third volume in English.) The imagery below is from the third printing of the book.

List of creatures

First Volume

Second Volume

Third Volume

See also
Gazu Hyakki Yagyō
Konjaku Gazu Zoku Hyakki
Konjaku Hyakki Shūi

References

Bibliography

External links

Edo-period works
Yōkai